The 1920–21 season was Stoke's 21st in the Football League and the third in the Second Division.

Despite strengthening the Stoke squad with veteran Tom Brittleton the most notable signing Stoke struggled all season and were involved in a fight against relegation. With one team being relegated this season, Stoke finished five points from bottom place Stockport County which was too close for comfort.

Season review

League
For the 1920–21 season efforts were made to strengthen the pool of players and the first of these was former England international  Tom Brittleton who made the move from Sheffield Wednesday and immediately became club captain. Competition for places or not manager Arthur Shallcross maintained a settled side that is until in October when he transferred Charlie Parker to Sunderland.  He had spent six years at Stoke and became a fan favourite.

A shortage of goals saw Stoke slip dangerously towards the lower regions of the Second Division as the 1920–21 season progressed and with only one club being relegated to the newly formed Third Division North the margin of five points and a 20th-place finish out of 22 was too close for comfort. Arthur Watkin top scored with 15 and Billy Tempest scored 10 however other than those two there was a lack of goals in the side.

A most significant signing in April 1921 was that of Bob McGrory, a full-back from Burnley. Rumours has it that McGrory had reservations about joining Stoke as he did not like the look of the place. Whether this was true or not, he went on to spend 31 years with the club as a player and manager eventually leaving the club in May 1952.

FA Cup
Stoke again exited the competition at the first hurdle losing 3–2 away at eventual runners-up Wolverhampton Wanderers in front of 35,000 spectators.

Final league table

Results
Stoke's score comes first

Legend

Football League Second Division

FA Cup

Squad statistics

References

Stoke City F.C. seasons
Stoke